Dummy Mommy is a 2012 South Korean weekend television series starring Kim Hyun-joo, Ha Hee-ra, Ahn Seo-hyun, Kim Jeong-hoon, Kim Tae-woo, Shin Hyun-joon, Yoo In-young and Gong Hyun-joo. It aired on SBS from March 17 to May 20, 2012 on Saturdays and Sundays at 21:50 for 20 episodes.

The show is based on a novel of the same name by Choi Yoo-kyung, which was published on October 28, 2005.

Plot
Kim Young-joo is a genius with an IQ of 200 and the youngest editor of a fashion magazine. Constantly embarrassed and ashamed of her sister's developmental disability and suffocated by her affection, Young-joo leaves home and runs away to get married. But after she gives birth to her own daughter and becomes a mother herself, Young-joo begins to see her life and family differently.

Cast

Main
Kim Hyun-joo as Kim Young-joo
Jo Min-ah as young Kim Young-joo
Ha Hee-ra as Kim Sun-young
Jo Jung-eun as young Kim Sun-young
Ahn Seo-hyun as Park Dat-byul
Kim Jeong-hoon as Lee Je-ha
Kim Tae-woo as Park Jung-do
Shin Hyun-joon as Choi Go-man
Yoo In-young as Oh Chae-rin
Gong Hyun-joo as Han Soo-in

Supporting
Park Hyung-sik as Oh Soo-hyun
Kim Ha-kyun as Oh Min-suk
Kim Chung as Jang Young-sook
Sa Hee as Park Jung-eun
Jo Duk-hyun as Butler Kim
Lee Joo-shil as Seo Gob-dan
Seo Dong-won as Bae Il-do
Baek Bo-ram as Hong Yi-rim
Lee Se-na as Kim Soo-ri
Park Chul-min as Kim Dae-young
Jung Hoon as Jin Tae-oh
Lee Eun-jung as Jo Sun-hee
Park Jae-rom as Na Jae-won
Chun Jae-ho as Robert Oh
Yang Eun-yong as Kang Hyun-joo
Hong Seok-cheon as hairdresser (cameo)

Episode ratings

Original soundtrack

Awards and nominations

References

External links
 

2012 South Korean television series debuts
2012 South Korean television series endings
Seoul Broadcasting System television dramas
Korean-language television shows
Television shows based on South Korean novels